Sabir Rustamkhanli (Azerbaijani: Sabir Khudu oğlu Rüstəmxanlı; 20 May, 1946) is an Azerbaijani poet and philologist. He is the author of over 30 books in the Russian and Persian languages.

Sabir Rustamkhanli is chairman of the Assembly of the World Congress of Azerbaijanis. Also he is
leader of the Civic Solidarity Party and member of the National Assembly of Azerbaijan.

Sabir Rustamkhanli was born on May 20, 1946 in Hamarkand village of Yardimli. In 1963, he graduated from the Yardimli settlement eleven-year school. He entered the faculty of philology of the Azerbaijan State University, where he graduated in 1968 with honors.

References

External links

VHP
Azeri Report

Sabir Rustamkhanli: “I am thinking of putting forward my candidature for presidency”
Congress of World Azerbaijanis Registered under Sabir Rustamkhanli's Name
VHP

1946 births
Living people
Azerbaijani male poets
Azerbaijani translators
20th-century Azerbaijani poets
Azerbaijani democracy activists
Azerbaijani diplomats
Members of the National Assembly (Azerbaijan)
People from Yardimli District
20th-century male writers
Leaders of political parties in Azerbaijan